John Meredith (born 23 September 1940 in Hatfield) is an English former professional footballer who played for Doncaster Rovers, Sheffield Wednesday, Chesterfield, Gillingham and Bournemouth & Boscombe Athletic during a 13-year professional career.

References

1940 births
Living people
Footballers from Doncaster
English footballers
Association football wingers
Doncaster Rovers F.C. players
Chesterfield F.C. players
Sheffield Wednesday F.C. players
Gillingham F.C. players
AFC Bournemouth players
Hastings United F.C. (1948) players
English Football League players
English football managers